Gastrodia elata is a saprophytic perennial herb in the family Orchidaceae. It is found in Nepal, Bhutan, India, Japan, North Korea, Siberia, Taiwan, and China.

Description
The orchid has an 8–12 centimeters long elliptical underground rhizome with a diameter of 3–5 centimeters but may grow up to 7 centimeters. The stem is erect with a height of 0.3–1 meter up to 2 meters, the orange yellow, tan, cylinder, and leafless.

The flowered pale olivine or the orange red, the scape is length 5–30 centimeters, longest may be 50 centimeters. Floral Bractsare long lanceolate, length 1-1.5 centimeters; Pedicel and ovary of branch 0.7–1.2 centimeter, slightly short in colored bract; The sepal and the petal produce a slanting pot shape perianth tube, the perianth tube long the approximately 1 centimeter, the diameter 5–7 millimeters. The labellum is white, circular, with a length of 6–7 millimeters and width of 3–4 millimeters, the tip 3 cracks, the base pastes the tight pistil column full terminal, has a pair of pulp callus, in the callus connection perianth tube. The pistil column length 5–7 millimeters, have the short pistil column foot.

Capsule each approximately 30, oval or but actually oval, length 1.2–1.8 centimeters, width 8–9 millimeters. The seed are most, 2 – 40,000 grains of each fruit, minimum, powdery. Flowering season June to July, fruit time July to August.

Growth
Gastrodia elata grows in symbiosis with the fungus Armillaria mellea on rotting wood, depending on the hypha of the fungus to invade the root system so that the plant can absorb nutrients from A. mellea.

Distribution and habitat
It is found in Nepal, Bhutan, India, Japan (Hokkaido, Honshu, Shikoku, Kyuushu), North Korea, Siberia, Taiwan, and China (in the provinces of Jilin, Liaoning, Inner Mongolia, Hebei, Shanxi, Shanxi, Gansu, Jiangsu, Anhui, Zhejiang, Jiangxi, Henan, Hunan, Hubei, Sichuan, Guizhou, Yunnan, and Tibet).

Chemical properties 
4-Hydroxybenzaldehyde and gastrodin can be found in the orchid G. elata. It also produces 2,4-Bis(4-hydroxybenzyl) phenol, gastrol, gastrodigenin and other related compounds.

Traditional use 

The herb is used in traditional Chinese medicine and Sichuan cuisine. It is one of the three orchids listed in the earliest known Chinese Materia Medica (Shennon bencaojing) (c. 100 AD). Medicinally, it is used for 'calming the liver' and for treating headaches, dizziness, tetanus, and epilepsy. According to "Nutrition Review," "Gastrodia root has been shown to exert novel pain relief and inflammatory-mediating activities, as well as in vivo and in vitro inhibitory activity on nitric oxide (NO) production."

References

elata
Orchids of China
Orchids of India
Orchids of Japan
Orchids of Russia
Orchids of Taiwan
Orchids of Nepal
Flora of Bhutan
Flora of South Korea
Flora of North Korea
Flora of Siberia
Vulnerable plants
Orchids of Guizhou
Orchids of Sichuan
Orchids of Yunnan
Flora of Anhui
Flora of Gansu
Flora of Hebei
Flora of Henan
Flora of Hubei
Flora of Hunan
Flora of Inner Mongolia
Flora of Jiangsu
Flora of Jiangxi
Flora of Shanxi
Flora of Tibet
Flora of Zhejiang
Taxonomy articles created by Polbot
Taxa named by Carl Ludwig Blume